Power Rangers Turbo is a television series and the fifth season of the Power Rangers franchise. The show was prefaced with the franchise's second film, Turbo: A Power Rangers Movie. As with its predecessors, Power Rangers Turbo is based on one of the entries of the Super Sentai series; in Turbo's case, the source is the 20th series, Gekisou Sentai Carranger. The series introduced a child actor as the new Blue Ranger, and featured the departure of the long-running characters Zordon and Alpha 5, as well the veteran team of Rangers and introduced four new characters to take the place of the veteran Rangers. The fifth series also marked the final regular appearances of Johnny Yong Bosch, Catherine Sutherland, and Steve Cardenas, and also the last appearance of Nakia Burrise.

Plot
After Maligore's defeat, Tommy Oliver, Adam Park, Tanya Sloan and Katherine Hillard graduate from high school and prepare to resume life as normal people, while the new 12-year-old Blue Ranger, Justin Stewart, skips ahead two grades and gets to go to Angel Grove High. Seeking revenge, Divatox begins to attack the Rangers. Soon after, the Rangers’ longtime mentors, Zordon and Alpha 5 depart to return to Zordon's home planet of Eltar, making way for the spectral Dimitria of Inquiris and Alpha 6. Other changes are also seen as Ernie leaves the Power Rangers universe to do volunteer work in South America, and Lt. Stone takes over the Juice Bar. Also an ally, the Blue Senturion arrives from the year 2000, with a message for Dimitria and the Rangers that Lord Zedd, Rita Repulsa, The Machine Empire and Divatox will team up to destroy the universe, but fails to show complete message due to Divatox corrupting the end of it, although it is believed to be Dark Specter.

Later, Tommy Oliver, Adam Park, Tanya Sloan and Katherine Hillard all of whom are leaving for their new chapters, are asked to pass on their powers to students T.J. Johnson, Carlos Vallerte, Ashley Hammond and Cassie Chan as the new Red, Green, Yellow and Pink Rangers respectively with Justin Stewart being the only remaining member of the team. The new team of Rangers are also joined by another ally, the Phantom Ranger, a mysterious being from another world. The team eventually learns that Dark Specter has captured Zordon, though Zordon is able to warn the Rangers not to rescue him as it would leave Earth defenseless. A short while later, the Rangers lose both the Turbo and Rescue Megazords in a battle with Divatox's most powerful monster yet, Goldgoyle. As Dimitria and the Blue Senturion leave for Eltar to help Zordon, Divatox finds the Power Chamber's location. Her army of grunts and monsters infiltrate the Chamber, defeating the team and destroying the Power Chamber. However, before Divatox tries to finish off the Rangers, she receives a message that Zordon has been captured and under the order of Dark Specter leaves for the Cimmerian planet. The powerless Rangers then leave Earth and head for space to save Zordon, with Justin choosing to stay behind with his father, although Justin Stewart does make an appearance in an episode of Power Rangers in Space to help the Space Rangers. These events lead to the next incarnation of the franchise, Power Rangers in Space.

Characters

Turbo Rangers

Original team
 Tommy Oliver  The First Red Turbo Ranger and leader; previously the Green Ranger, the White Ranger, and the Red Zeo Ranger. He was Katherine Hillard's love interest. He piloted the Red Lightning Turbozord and his primary weapon was the Turbo Lightning Sword. He is portrayed by Jason David Frank.
 Justin Stewart  The Original Blue Turbo Ranger; when Rocky injured himself, Justin was chosen by Zordon to be the Blue Ranger. Justin, however, was 12 years old and inexperienced. So, to compensate for his youth, he was able to morph into an adult-sized form as the Blue Ranger. Justin is the only common member between the first and second team of Turbo Rangers. He piloted the Mountain Blaster Turbozord and the Siren Blaster Rescuezord. His primary weapon was the Turbo Hand Blasters. He is portrayed by Blake Foster.
 Adam Park  The First Green Turbo Ranger; previously the second Mighty Morphin Black Ranger and the Green Zeo Ranger. He piloted the Desert Thunder Turbozord and his primary weapon was the Turbo Thunder Cannon. He is portrayed by Johnny Yong Bosch.
 Tanya Sloan  The First Yellow Turbo Ranger; formerly the Yellow Zeo Ranger. She piloted the Dune Star Turbozord and her primary weapon was the Turbo Star Chargers. She is portrayed by Nakia Burrise.
 Katherine "Kat" Hillard  The First Pink Turbo Ranger; previously the second Mighty Morphin Pink Ranger and the Pink Zeo Ranger. She was Tommy Oliver's love interest. She piloted the Wind Chaser Turbozord and her primary weapon was the Turbo Wind Fire. She is portrayed by Catherine Sutherland.

New team
 Theodore Jay "T.J." Jarvis Johnson T.J. is the Second Red Turbo Ranger and new leader. A friendly and warm-hearted baseball player, he was chosen by Tommy to be his replacement based on his bravery in protecting others. He piloted the Red Lightning Turbozord and the Lightning Fire Tamer Rescuezord. His primary weapon is the Turbo Lightning Sword. He is portrayed by Selwyn Ward.
Carlos Vallerte Carlos is the Second Green Turbo Ranger. A proud and hot-tempered soccer player, he was chosen by Adam to be his replacement because he proved himself to be decisive and intelligent. He piloted the Desert Thunder Turbozord and the Thunder Loader Rescuezord. His primary weapon is the Turbo Thunder Cannon. He is portrayed by Roger Velasco. 
Ashley Hammond Ashley is the Second Yellow Turbo Ranger. An upbeat and hardworking cheerleader, she was chosen by Tanya to be her replacement due to her compassion and integrity. She piloted the Dune Star Turbozord and the Star Racer Rescuezord. Her primary weapon is the Turbo Star Chargers. She is portrayed by Tracy Lynn Cruz.
Cassie Chan Cassie is the Second Pink Turbo Ranger. A gutsy and sarcastic singer, she was chosen by Katherine to be her replacement because she is loyal and trustworthy. She piloted the Wind Chaser Turbozord and Wind Rescue Rescuezord. Her primary weapon is the Turbo Wind Fire. She is portrayed by Patricia Ja Lee.

Supporting characters
 Zordon  The original mentor to the Power Rangers since Mighty Morphin. At the beginning of the series, he and Alpha 5 leave for Eltar. He is voiced by Robert L. Manahan.
 Alpha 5  Zordon's robotic assistant from Edenoi. At the beginning of the series, he and Zordon leave for Eltar. He is voiced by Richard Steven Horvitz.
 Rocky DeSantos  Formerly the second Mighty Morphin Red Ranger and the Blue Zeo Ranger. He is portrayed by Steve Cardenas.
 Dimitria  Dimitria is a being from the planet Inquirus who succeeds Zordon as the Turbo Rangers's new mentor as he left for Eltar. She is portrayed by Carol Hoyt.
 Alpha 6  Alpha 6 appears at the Power Chamber who succeed Alpha 5. He is voiced by Katerina Luciani.
 Lerigot  Lerigot appeared to help Zordon and Alpha 5 get to Eltar. He is voiced by Lex Lang (uncredited).
 Blue Senturion  An intergalactic police officer from the future. He is voiced by David Walsh (uncredited until The Accident).
 Farkus "Bulk" Bulkmeier  Earlier in the series, Bulk is turned into a chimpanzee by Elgar and was restored to normal half-way through. Afterwards, he and Skull did a bunch of odd jobs. He is portrayed by Paul Schrier.
 Eugene "Skull" Skullovitch  Earlier in the series, Skull is turned into a chimpanzee by Elgar and was restored to normal half-way through. Afterwards, he and Bulk did a bunch of odd jobs. He is portrayed by Jason Narvy.
 Jerome B. Stone  When Ernie's peace corps recalled him to help "build a bridge in the Amazon," Jerome became the new proprietor of the Angel Grove Youth Center and Juice Bar. He is portrayed by Gregg Bullock.
 Phantom Ranger  A mysterious Ranger whose powers come from Eltar. He is voiced by Alex Dodd.
 Robot Rangers  Robotic versions of the Turbo Rangers that were created by Zordon and tested on Earth against Flash Head and Voltmeister. They are portrayed by the same actors that portrayed TJ, Carlos, Justin, Ashley, and Cassie.

Villains
 Divatox  The series' main villain and is known throughout the universe as the Queen of Evil, Dark Queen of Space and the  Beautiful Queen of Darkness. Divatox is an intergalactic space pirate who leads a large number of cutthroats in her evil conquests throughout the universe. From her base, the gigantic fish-shaped submarine known as the Subcraft, Divatox and her minions travel about the universe plundering riches to satisfy Divatox's greed. Divatox would later pilot the eagle-like Eaglezord. In Power Rangers in Space, when the Red Space Ranger shattered Zordon's energy tube, the resulting wave destroyed the majority of the universe's evil forces, but "purified" others instead. Divatox was among those purified, along with Rita Repulsa and Lord Zedd. She is portrayed by Carol Hoyt in episodes 1–25, Hilary Shepard Turner in Turbo: A Power Rangers Movie, episodes 26–45, In Space.
 Elgar The dimwitted nephew of space pirate Divatox and General Havoc, and grandson of Mama D. Elgar was armed with the Card Sword, named as such due to the blade looking like a row of playing cards. Elgar could fire blasts of energy from the sword, as well as teleport. He was also the one responsible for turning Bulk and Skull into chimpanzees during the earlier part of the series. Elgar would later pilot the Terrorzord. In Power Rangers in Space, Elgar's services were transferred to Astronema. During Dark Specter's Universal Conquest (as seen in "Countdown to Destruction"), Elgar was sent to Earth to lead the Piranhatrons and Quantrons the final assault in Angel Grove. He remained there for the time being, until he was caught by the energy wave of Zordon, which reduced him to sand, as did the Quantrons and Piranhatrons on Earth in Power Rangers in Space. He is voiced by Derek Stephen Prince.
 Rygog The mutant servant of Divatox. He serves as her loyal warrior and able to fire lasers from his eyes. Rygog later pilots the golden lion-themed Catzord. Although he was present for the majority of "Countdown to Destruction," he was not seen when the wave hit so it is assumed he was destroyed. He is voiced by Lex Lang.
 Porto An alien resembling a life raft with portholes in it that has limbs, with one showing his goggle-wearing face. Porto is Divatox's top adviser. He would later pilot the blue shark-themed Sharkzord. He was not seen in "Countdown to Destruction," so it is unknown if or how Zordon's energy wave affected him. He is voiced by Scott Page-Pagter.
 Mama D. The mother of Divatox, General Havoc, and an unidentified third child (the unnamed parent of Elgar), and is grandmother of Elgar. She is portrayed by Carol White.
 General Havoc The son of Mama D, the brother of the space pirate Divatox, and an unnamed third sibling (possibly Dimitria), as well as the uncle of Elgar. Twice in his fight with the Rangers, General Havoc piloted the dinosaur-like Metallosaurus. In "Countdown to Destruction," General Havoc assisted the Machine Empire in attacking the Phantom Ranger's home world. He is destroyed by Zordon's Energy Wave. He is voiced by Richard Cansino in most appearances and by Tom Wyner in one appearance.
 Piranhatrons Divatox's armored piranha-like foot soldiers.
 Putra Pods Divatox's Stegosaurus-like soldiers. Divatox uses them in the movie to attack the Ghost Gallion, an old pirate ship the Turbo Rangers were using to go after her.
 Chromites General Havoc's foot soldiers.

Monsters
The monsters of this series were used by Divatox. They were adapted from the monsters seen in Gekisou Sentai Carranger. To make a monster grow, Divatox would give orders to launch special torpedoes at the monster. These torpedoes when hitting the monster upon impact would make them grow. Footage from Carranger was also used to show monster growth. The monster who was growing would gain a red face and breathe smoke/steam before the monster would actually grow.

 Amphibitor (voiced by Bob Papenbrook) – A big-mouthed red-eyed tree frog-like monster sent by Divatox to activate the wormhole closing device to stop Zordon. Amphibitor seemed to have a large appetite and wanted to eat the Turbo Rangers. In battle, he wielded a giant knife and fork. It was destroyed by the Turbo Megazord.
 Shadow Chromite (voiced by Ken Merckx) – A version of Chromite that was mostly refracted light. He used its ability to siphon the Rangers' powers and create Shadow Rangers. He was destroyed by the Turbo Megazord when it blocks out the sun.
 Visceron (voiced by David Walsh) – A race car driver-themed alien who was turned into a dishwasher-type monster by Divatox. This form caused Visceron to keep cleaning Divatox's submarine. He regressed back to normal upon getting caught in a detonator blast.
 Demon Racers (voiced by Tom Fahn) – Two super-quick racing demon monsters used by Divatox. The first one was destroyed by the Green Ranger. The second was destroyed by the Turbo Megazord.
 Big Burpa (voiced by Brianne Siddall) – A burping biker monster used by Divatox. She was destroyed by the Turbo Megazord.
 Mouthpiece (voiced by Ezra Weisz) – A lie-telling clown monster used by Divatox. He was to make his victims lie uncontrollably and for each lie told, a Pirahnatron would appear. The trick to breaking his spell is to tell a lie that is also the truth. He was destroyed by the Turbo Megazord.
 Pharaoh (voiced by John C. Hyke) – An ancient Pharaoh/appraiser-themed villain who was the former fiancé to Divatox. His staff was capable of turning normal English-language writing into hieroglyphics; he was powerless without it. He was destroyed by the Turbo Megazord.
 Numbor (voiced by Ezra Weisz) – A number-altering scholar/calculator monster used by Divatox. He is able to add and subtract weight on anything he wants. He was destroyed by the Turbo Megazord.
 Blazinator (voiced by Richard Epcar) – An ordinary fire truck that was turned into a monster by a detonator.
 Terror Tooth (voiced by Eddie Frierson) – A spiked snapping turtle monster used by Divatox. He was destroyed by Robo Racer.
 Electrovolt (voiced by Tom Wyner) – An electrical monster used by Divatox that rides an electric bicycle. He provided Elgar with his own electrical bicycle implying that they are old friends. He was destroyed by the Turbo Megazord and Robo Racer.
 Wolfgang Amadeus Griller (voiced by Peter Greenwood) – A musical loudspeaker-armored zombie monster used by Divatox. He used his musical power to make objects float and fly towards his targets. Because Elgar and Rygog were cleaning the torpedoes, He was destroyed by the Blue Senturion and the Red Turbo Ranger.
 Shrinkasect (voiced by Michael Sorich) – An insect collector-dressed grasshopper monster used by Divatox. He can shrink things, and people shrunk by his power, gradually gain insect-like parts. He was destroyed by Robo Racer.
 Flamite (voiced by Derek Stephen Prince) – A fire-breathing octopus monster used by Divatox. He can breathe fire from his mouth. He was destroyed by the Turbo Megazord.
 Delisha Ennivel (portrayed by Forbes Riley in human form) Delisha Ennivel is a fashion designer-themed tropical fish monster. She helped spread jackets Divatox created to make humans unreasonable and childish, disabling the Rangers teamwork aside from Ashley. She did this while in the form of a fashion designer. She was destroyed by Robo Racer and the Turbo Megazord.
 Dreadfeather (voiced by Steve Kramer) – An Archaeopteryx monster used by Divatox. He was destroyed by Lightning Cruiser and the Storm Blaster.
 Mad Mike the Pizza Chef (voiced by Ari Ross) A pizza chef-themed monster created by Porto when he touched a picture on Mad Mike's drawing bringing him to life. He was destroyed by Robo Racer and the Turbo Megazord.
 Translucitor (voiced by Ken Merckx) – A shaman-themed bird themed  monster used by Divatox. He can make things invisible, inaudible, and intangible; however, the reflections of these things are unaffected, while transmissions like the communicators are disabled. He was destroyed by the Turbo Megazord.
 Clockster (voiced by Richard Cansino) – A time-controlling adding machine monster used by Divatox to rewind time when the Rangers kept beating her. Clockster's idiocy nearly stopped time forever, when he touched a freezing device Divatox was using to start a new Ice Age. Clockster could also blast ring-shaped lasers from his eyes. He was destroyed by the Turbo Megazord.
 Metal Mangler (voiced by Brianne Siddall) – A metal monster pulled to Earth from General Havoc's Space Base along with Divatox's laser cannon and presumably destroyed upon impact by the Rangers' super magnet.
 Crosspatch (voiced by Glen McDougal) – A pirate-themed monster used by Divatox. He was destroyed by the Rescue Megazord.
 Flashhead (voiced by Paul Pistore) – A photographer-themed monster used by Divatox. He is able to change anything he flashes with his camera into a movie strip. Flashhead fought the Turbo Rangers at the time when they testing the Robot Rangers. He was destroyed by the Rescue Megazord.
 Voltmeister (voiced by Michael Sorich) – An electrical animal trainer-themed monster used by Divatox. He was destroyed by the Rescue Megazord.
 Wicked Wisher (voiced by Tom Fahn) – A coin purse monster used by Divatox and acted as her errand boy. He was sent to create three wishing coins. He was destroyed by the Rescue Megazord.
 Wild Weeder (voiced by Derek Stephen Prince) – A gardener-themed monster whose seeds of evil were used to turn civilians into slaves that wear bee-colored clothing called Diva-Drones for the purpose of seeking out the missing third wishing coin that the Wicked Wisher had originally summoned. He was destroyed by the Rescue Megazord.
 Mutant Bees – A swarm of mutant bees summoned by Wild Weeder. The last one was destroyed by Robo Racer.
 Torch Tiger (voiced by Bob Papenbrook) – A fire-breathing tiger/strongman monster. After using the Rangers' stolen Booster Fuel to power his bike, he drank it, which enabled his fire attacks to get stronger. He was destroyed by the Rescue Megazord.
 Maniac Mechanic (voiced by William Butler) – An auto mechanic-themed monster used by Divatox to repair her periscope. She later employed him to build a Battle Wagon by stealing parts from Ashley's car. He was destroyed by the Rescue Megazord.
 Lord Litter (voiced by Ezra Weisz) – A love letter-themed monster used by Divatox. He was destroyed by 4 of the Rescuezords in High Stance Mode, using the Artillery Cannons. He angered the spirit of nature in Angel Grove, Erutan, who helped the Rangers defeat him.
 Crash and the Creeps – A Ranger-like band of musical monsters used by Divatox who initially took a human form and brainwashed people with her hit number "The Song of Confusion", which gets stuck in peoples heads. The Creeps were Destroyed by the Turbo R.A.M., while Crash was destroyed by the Turbo Megazord.
 Crash (voiced by Kirk Thornton) – The Ranger-like leader of the Creeps and the lead guitarist.
 Blue Creep – A gorilla/police officer-themed member of the Creeps and their keyboardist.
 Green Creep – A frog/fish/soldier-themed member of the Creeps and their bassist.
 Yellow Creep – A turkey/vulture/aircraft pilot-themed member of the Creeps and their drummer.
 Pink Creep – A white cat-themed member of the Creeps and their rhythm guitarist.
 Mr. Goorific (voiced by Dave Mallow) – A make-up artist-themed monster used by Divatox whose goo can change people into animals and vice versa. He was destroyed by the Rescue Megazord.
 Strikeout (voiced by Michael McConnohie) – A baseball monster used by Divatox. His most lethal attack is his curve ball. He was destroyed by the Turbo Megazord.
 Count Nocturne (voiced by Tom Fahn) – A vampire bat monster created by Divatox when she wrapped her tongue around a passing lunar bat. His bites can turn anyone into vampires. He was destroyed by the Rescue Turbo Megazord.
 Goldgoyle (voiced by Tom Wyner) – An immensely powerful monster. He was responsible for the destruction of both Megazords. He was destroyed by the Turbo R.A.M.

In the episode "Fire in Your Tank", there were unnamed monsters that were seen in Divatox's boot camp that are either recycled, repainted, and hybrid versions of other monsters. These monsters cheered on Torch Tiger following his power upgrade. They consist of:

 A de-petaled version of Bloom of Doom from Mighty Morphin Power Rangers.
 A black, hornless, and fur-added version of Robogoat from Mighty Morphin Power Rangers.
 A recolored Pirantishead with the duplicate of Hate Master's hair from Mighty Morphin Power Rangers.
 A monster with the head of Ninja Sentai Kakuranger monster Karakasa (minus the umbrella on its head and unused in Mighty Morphin Power Rangers season three) and the body of Hate Master.
 A robotic monster with the repainted and altered head of Main Drain's second form, the horns of Robogoat, and the repainted and scaled-down body of Cruel Chrome.
 A tunic-wearing robotic monster with the silver-repainted head of Cruel Chrome and the body of Mean Screen from Power Rangers Zeo.
 An oddly-colored version of Fighting Flea from Mighty Morphin Power Rangers.
 A recolored, caped, stinger-added, and de-shelled version of Turbanshell from Mighty Morphin Power Rangers.
 A monster that has the striped body of an unused Ninja Sentai Kakuranger monster Keukegen and the shoulders of Cruel Chrome from Power Rangers Zeo.
 A monster that resembles an unused Ninja Sentai Kakuranger monster Rokurokubi minus the head and now sporting antlers.

Film

Episodes

Comics
In 1997, Acclaim Comics published three one-shots based on Power Rangers Turbo. The first book was Power Rangers Turbo vs. Beetleborgs Metallix, featuring a crossover with the Saban-produced Beetleborgs.  The other two were part of the Saban Powerhouse books called Power Rangers Turbo: Into The Fire & Other Stories and Power Rangers Turbo: Simple Simon Says & Other Stories.

In 2018, Boom! Studios published a back-up serial by Ryan Ferrier and Bachan in Mighty Morphin Power Rangers #25–36. It featured a team-up between the Blue Senturion and Ninjor.

Home media
In 2012, Shout Factory announced that it had reached an exclusive distribution deal with Saban for shows such as Power Rangers and Big Bad Beetleborgs. Power Rangers Turbo was released on DVD in August 2012, as part of a Time-Life exclusive boxed set containing seasons 1–7. The show later became available independently of the boxed set in two volumes, the first volume consisting of first 23 episodes was released on April 1, 2014 and the second volume containing the remaining 22 episodes was released on June 3, 2014.

Notes

References

External links

 
 "Turbo: A Power Rangers Movie at Fox Kids (Archive)
 

 
Turbo
Fox Broadcasting Company original programming
1997 American television series debuts
1997 American television series endings
Fox Kids
Science fantasy television series
1990s American science fiction television series
Television shows filmed in Los Angeles
Television shows filmed in Santa Clarita, California
Television shows set in California
English-language television shows
Television series by Saban Entertainment
Television series about size change
1990s American high school television series
American children's action television series
American children's adventure television series
American children's fantasy television series
Television series created by Haim Saban